The 2011 Pro Tour season was the sixteenth season of the Magic: The Gathering Pro Tour. It began on 22 January 2011 with Grand Prix Atlanta, and ended on 20 November 2011 with the conclusion of the  2011 World Championship in San Francisco. The season consisted of twenty Grands Prix, and four Pro Tours, located in Paris, Nagoya, Philadelphia, and San Francisco.

Mode 

Four Pro Tours and eighteen Grands Prix were held in the 2011 season. Further Pro Points were awarded at national championships. These Pro Points were mainly used to determine the Pro Player club levels of players participating in these events, but also decide which player was awarded the Pro Player of the year title at the end of the season. Based on final standings Pro Points are awarded as follows:

Grand Prix: Atlanta 

GP Atlanta (22–23 January 2011)
Format: Extended
Attendance: 1223
 Jason Ford
 Ben Stark
 Jody Keith
 Christian Valenti
 Ari Lax
 John Runyon
 Charles Gindy
 Owen Turtenwald

Pro Tour – Paris (10–13 February 2011) 

Pro Tour Paris was held at Espace Champerret. The formats were Standard and Scars of Mirrodin-Mirrodin Besieged Booster Draft.

Tournament data 
Prize pool: $230,795
Format: Standard, Booster Draft

Top 8

Final standings

Pro Player of the year standings

Grands Prix: Paris, Denver, Hamburg, Kobe, Barcelona, Dallas, London, Prague, Providence, and Singapore 

Originally scheduled for the weekend of 12–13 March GP Hamburg was cancelled as announced on 13 January. On 14 March 2011, Wizards of the Coast announced that GP Kobe, originally scheduled for 19–20 March, had been postponed, citing safety, power and travel concerns.

GP Paris (12–13 February)
Format: Limited
Attendance: 2182
 David Sharfman
 William Lowry
 Christian Hüttenberger
 Gerald Leitzinger
 Kai Budde
 Sveinung Bjørnerud
 Lewis McLeod
 Dimitris Davios

GP Dallas (9–10 April)
Format: Standard
Attendance: 1189
 David Shiels
 Orrin Beasley
 Owen Turtenwald
 Austin Bursavich
 Alex Bertoncini
 Josh Utter-Leyton
 Michael Jacob
 Korey McDuffie

GP Prague (21–22 May)
Format: Limited
Attendance: 1236
 Ondrej Baudys
 Lukas Blohon
 Shuhei Nakamura
 Anders Melin
 Petr Brozek
 Lukasz Cichecki
 Joel Larsson
 Robert Jurkovic

GP Denver (19–20 February)
Format: Limited
Attendance: 841
 Gaudenis Vidugiris
 Martin Juza
 Owen Turtenwald
 Eduardo dos Santos Vieira
 Thomas Pannell
 Paul Cheon
 James Zornes
 Brian Kibler

GP Kobe (23–24 April)
Format: Extended
Attendance: 710
 Shouta Yasooka
 Makihito Mihara
 Kenichiro Omori
 Shunsuke Aka
 Shinya Satou
 Shouhei Yamamoto
 Martin Juza
 Kentaro Ino

GP Providence (28–29 May)
Format: Legacy
Attendance: 1179
 James Rynkiewicz
 Bryan Eleyet
 Paulo Vitor Damo da Rosa
 Reid Duke
 Owen Turtenwald
 Wilson Hunter
 John Kubilis
 Alex Majlaton

GP Barcelona (26–27 March)
Format: Standard
Attendance: 1201
 Martin Scheinin
 Toni Ramis Pascual
 Richard Bland
 Eduardo Sajgalik
 Jonas Köstler
 Karol Nosowicz
 Guillaume Wafo-Tapa
 Simon Bertiou

GP London (30 April–1 May)
Format: Limited
Attendance: 709
 Daniel Royde
 Louis Deltour
 Martin Lindström
 Gennaro Mango
 Raul Porojan
 Andra La Placa
 Kenny Öberg
 Nicholas Taylor

GP Singapore (4–5 June)
Format: Standard
Attendance: 623
 Paulo Vitor Damo da Rosa
 Chikara Nakahima
 Chatchai Seathang
 Owen Turtenwald
 Shouta Yasooka
 Weng Heng Soh
 Hao-Shan Huang
 Marios Angelopozlos

Pro Tour – Nagoya (10–12 June 2011) 

Pro Tour Nagoya was held at the Trade & Industry Center. The formats are Block Constructed and Booster Draft.

Tournament data 
Prize pool: $230,795
Format: Block Constructed, Booster Draft

Top 8 

Top 8 pairings are determined at random

Final standings

Pro Player of the year standings

Grands Prix: Kansas City, Shanghai, and Pittsburgh 

GP Kansas City (18–19 June)
Format: Limited
Attendance: 879
 Luis Scott-Vargas
 Yuuya Watanabe
 Tim Aten
 Samuel Friedman
 Zach Jesse
 Gregory Jolin
 Matthew Costa
 Willy Edel

GP Shanghai (20–21 August)
Format: Limited
Attendance: 633
 Yuuya Watanabe
 Ryouta Endou
 Zhiyang Zhang
 Kentarou Ino
 Kuang Chen
 Kentarou Nonaka
 Daniel Pham
 Bin Xu

GP Pittsburgh (27–28 August)
Format: Standard
Attendance: 1435
 Yuuya Watanabe 
 Lukasz Musial
 Patrick Chapin
 Max Tietze 
 Joel Larsson
 Matthew Nass 
 Florian Pils
 Harry Corvese

Pro Tour – Philadelphia (2–4 September 2011) 

Pro Tour Philadelphia was held at the Philadelphia Convention Center. The formats were initially announced to be Extended and Booster Draft. Three weeks before the event it was announced that the Extended portion would be replaced by Modern.  The winner of the tournament was Samuel Estratti, who became the first Modern Pro Tour Champion and the first Italian player to win a Pro Tour.

Tournament data 
Prize pool: $230,795
Players: 417
Format: Modern, Booster Draft
Headjudge: Riccardo Tessitori

Top 8

Final standings

Pro Player of the year standings

Grands Prix: Montreal, Milan, Brisbane, Amsterdam, Santiago, Hiroshima, and San Diego

GP Montreal (17–18 September)
Format: Limited
Attendance: 1054
 Richard Hoaen
 Alexander Hayne
 Lino Burgold
 Andrew Noworaj
 Reid Duke
 Alex West
 Michael Holden
 Matthew Costa

GP Amsterdam (22–23 October)
Format: Legacy
Attendance: 1878
 Pierre Sommen
 Ciro Bonaventura
 Christof Kovacs
 Elie Pichon
 Fabian Görzgen
 Maciej Pasek
 Kim Grymer
 Paolo Pavesi

GP San Diego (12–13 November)
Format: Limited
Attendance: 1045
 Shahar Shenhar
 Richard Bland
 Ricky Sidher
 Lokman Chen
 Elias Watsfeldt
 Owen Turtenwald
 Aaron Cheng
 Alexander West

GP Milan (8–9 October)
Format: Limited
Attendance: 1790
 Marco Ricci
 Raphaël Lévy
 Samuele Estratti
 Davide Vergoni
 Alexandru Dimitriu
 Marcello Calvetto
 Michael Milis
 Jörg Unfried

GP Santiago (22–23 October)
Format: Limited
Attendance: 737
 Igor Silva Pinto
 Carlos Iturra
 Owen Turtenwald
 Melissa DeTora
 Martin Juza 
 Paulo Vitor Damo da Rosa
 David Kaliski
 Martin Lecce

GP Brisbane (15–16 October)
Format: Standard 
Attendance: 389
 Jeremy Neeman
 Tim Fondum
 Andreas Pranoto
 Luke Mulcahy
 Hao-Shan Huang
 Jacky Zhang
 Daniel Unwin
 Shouta Yasooka

GP Hiroshima (29–30 October)
Format: Standard
Attendance: 796
 Martin Juza
 Takahiro Shiraki
 Akira Asahara
 Rin Satou
 Kouichi Tashiro
 Hiroshi Onizuka
 Naoki Obayashi
 Kouichi Tanaka

2011 World Championships – San Francisco (17–20 November 2011) 

The 18th Magic World Championships was held in the Fort Mason Center in San Francisco, United States.

Tournament data 

Prize pool: $245,245 (individual) + ? (teams)
Players: 375 from 60 countries
Formats: Standard, Booster Draft, Modern
Team Formats: Standard, Modern, Legacy
Head Judge: Sheldon Menery

Top 8

Final standings

Team competition 
 Japan — Ryuuichirou Ishida, Makihito Mihara, Tomoya Fujimoto
 Norway — Sveinung Bjørnerud, Kristoffer Jonassen, Andreas Nordahl

Pro Player of the Year final standings

Performance by country

References 

Magic: The Gathering professional events